The Fuwa (literally "good-luck dolls", also known as "Friendlies") were the mascots of the 2008 Summer Olympics in Beijing. The designs were created by Han Meilin, a famous Chinese artist. The designs were publicly announced by the National Society of Chinese Classic Literature Studies on 11 November 2005 at an event marking the 1000th day before the opening of the games.

There are five Fuwas: Beibei, Jingjing, Huanhuan, Yingying and Nini. Together, the names form the sentence "", or "Beijing huanying ni," which means "Beijing welcomes you". Originally named 'The Friendlies', they were promoted as 'Fuwa' when concerns arose that the name could be misinterpreted.

While originally given artistic licence in his commission, Han Meilin was subsequently requested by officials to include various Chinese designs and fauna in the Fuwa.  Han Meilin drew 1,000 models of possible Fuwa (including a dragon and an anthropomorphic drum) before settling on the five characters. He has since disowned the Fuwa and did not include them in his museum.

Mascots

Media

TV series

A 100-episode Olympic-themed anime series featuring the Fuwa was released in China, primarily on BTV (Beijing's municipal television network), on 8 August 2007. Titled The Olympic Adventures of Fuwa, it was jointly produced by BTV and Kaku Cartoon. It ran from 8 August to 1 October 2007.

There are also two sequels created by CCTV, Beibei's Promise and the Five Rings.

Video game
The characters made a cameo appearance in the Mario & Sonic at the Olympic Games video game.

China Environmental Awareness Programme
The China Environmental Awareness Programme program, started in 2001, has the Fuwa raising public environmental awareness by spreading clean, green messages.

Fuwa theater show
A large-scale fairy-tale drama entitled Friendlies (or Fuwa) has been directed by Beijing Children's Art Theater Cooperative to promote the five mascots of the 2008 Beijing Olympics. As ambassadors of peace, the Fuwa would make a world-tour, visiting all seven continents.

Parodies
Groups seeking to raise political issues in tandem with China's hosting of the Olympic Games have used the Fuwa or have created similar mascots.

 Nu Wa, a monkey with a red bandana, was created by Amnesty International. Nu Wa means "angry young boy".
 Play Fair 2008, a campaign organised by the Clean Clothes Campaign (CCC), the International Trade Union Confederation (ITUC), and the International Textile, Garment and Leather Workers' Federation (ITGLWF) to raise awareness for the rights of workers involved in the sporting goods industries, have used the Fuwa.
 Gengen Genocide, a brown and yellow character wearing a gun and a fuel pump nozzle head-dress that forms a skull and crossbones, was developed by a group seeking to raise attention to the People's Republic of China's involvement in Darfur.  Gengen's name is derived from the term genocide.

In addition, Beijing residents have allegedly created their own Fuwa set consisting of a duck, a dragonfly and a taxi.  Collectively their names—"Ya", "Ting", "De"—spell out "bastard" in Beijing slang. (Note that among friends, "ni ya ting de", which means "you bastard", is a common term of endearment but is considered crude by many.)

Superstitions

Wuwa
In the months leading up to the Olympics, coincidental similarities between the characters and several events became were noted on the internet blogs under titles such as "Curse of the Fuwa". Some Chinese citizens have taken to calling the characters "Wuwa" (巫娃, witch dolls). Online criticism of the dolls has frequently been censored.

 Nini, a swallow thought to be a kite, was blamed for the "kite city" of Weifang T195 train accident.  Nini was also believed to be a locust, and associated with a locust plague that infested Inner Mongolia in June 2008.
 Yingying, a Tibetan antelope, for the 2008 Tibetan unrest.
 Huanhuan, representing the Olympic flame, for the Summer Olympics torch relay protests.
 Jingjing, a panda, for the Sichuan earthquake. The epicenter of the earthquake is very close to the Wolong Nature Reserve.
 Beibei, a Chinese sturgeon of water/sea element, for the 2008 South China floods.

Killer barracuda
Beibei is represented by a Chinese sturgeon. Five sturgeons were presented by China to Hong Kong with each fish representing an Olympic ring, in addition to the "motherland's love" for the Hong Kong Special Administrative Region. The smallest of the five sturgeon (1.1 meters) was bitten by one of the barracudas housed in the same aquarium, and died the day after being publicly released into the city's theme park aquarium Ocean Park. Necropsy showed that the bite was not aggressive, but a reflex action from contact between the fish. Ocean Park said no one is at fault since in the almost 10 years the eight barracudas had been with the park, they had never showed any signs of aggression. Feng shui experts were divided about the death of the sturgeon, there were some that said this event may imply misfortune, and there were some that said 'the public did not need to worry too much because all fish die' and 'Can I say it's a bad omen for the Olympic Games if, for example, my five tadpoles—which I say represent the Olympic rings—die at home?'. Beijing's central government replaced the one that died with five more sturgeons.

Han Meilin
Han Meilin suffered two heart attacks while designing the Fuwa.

See also

 Fu Niu Lele, mascot of the 2008 Summer Paralympics in Beijing
 Miga, Quatchi and Mukmuk, mascots of the 2010 Winter Olympics in Vancouver
 Vinicius, mascot of the 2016 Summer Olympics in Rio de Janeiro
 Miraitowa, mascot of the 2020 Summer Olympics in Tokyo
 Bing Dwen Dwen, mascot of the 2022 Winter Olympics in Beijing
 Shuey Rhon Rhon, mascot of the 2022 Winter Paralympics in Beijing

Notes

References

External links

 The Official Mascots of the Beijing 2008 Olympic Games (English)
 The Official Mascots of the Beijing 2008 Olympic Games (Chinese)
 Comments on the linguistics of the Friendlies' names
 Fuwa Papercraft

2008 Summer Olympics
Mascots introduced in 2005
China Central Television original programming
Chinese culture
Fictional animals
Fictional characters with water abilities
Fictional characters with superhuman strength
Fictional characters with fire or heat abilities
Fictional characters who can move at superhuman speeds
Fictional characters with air or wind abilities
Chinese mascots
Fictional characters from Beijing
Fictional shapeshifters
Olympic mascots